Steffen Popp (born in Greifswald, 18 July 1978) is a German poet, novelist and literary translator.

He has translated Ben Lerner and other American poets.

Awards
 2003: Preisträger der Akademie Graz
 2004: Kranichsteiner Literaturpreis 
 2006: Nominierung zum Deutschen Buchpreis
 2010: Förderungspreis zum Kunstpreis Berlin
 2011: Leonce-und-Lena-Preis
 2011: Preis der Stadt Münster für Europäische Poesie for his translations of Ben Lerner

References

External links
 
 Steffen Popp – Litport
 Gedichte vom Autor gelesen und in verschiedenen Sprachen auf lyrikline.org

1945 births
People from Greifswald
German poets
German translators
Translators from English
Translators to German
Living people
German male poets
German male novelists
German male non-fiction writers